The Blood Road is the eleventh book in the bestselling Logan McRae detective series set in Aberdeenshire by Stuart MacBride.

Plot
Now working for professional standards as an inspector, McRae is called out to a car crash with the driver dead in the front seat. He questions the police officer that called him out as to why he is there; she tells him that the driver is Detective Inspector Bell, who they buried two years ago. Having to investigate Bell's apparent faked death and resurrection, McRae also becomes embroiled in an investigation into a child paedophile ring, known as the "Livestock Mart".

Reception
Whilst the book garnered positive reviews, some reviewers felt uncomfortable with the very graphic descriptions of the paedophilic sex-ring. Breda Brown, writing in the Sunday Independent, said 

Louise Fairbairn, writing in The Scotsman, described the book as being MacBride's best work to date.

Notes

References

2018 British novels
Novels set in Aberdeenshire
Novels by Stuart MacBride
HarperCollins books